William Franklyn Verner (June 24, 1883 – July 1, 1966) was an American athlete and middle-distance runner who competed in the early twentieth century.

Verner was born in Grundy County, Illinois.

He competed in Athletics at the 1904 Summer Olympics and won a silver medal in the 1500 metres in 4:06.8 behind James Lightbody, and a silver medal with the US Chicago team in the four mile race. In the 2590 metre steeplechase competition he finished fourth and in the 800 metres event he finished sixth.

He died in Pinckney, Michigan.

References

External links
profile

1883 births
1966 deaths
American male middle-distance runners
American male steeplechase runners
Olympic silver medalists for the United States in track and field
Athletes (track and field) at the 1904 Summer Olympics
Medalists at the 1904 Summer Olympics